INS Ghorpad was a  of the Indian Navy.

History
Built at the Gdańsk Shipyard in Poland, INS Ghorpad was commissioned on 21 December 1974. She was decommissioned on 11 January 2008.

See also
Ships of the Indian Navy

References

Kumbhir-class tank landing ships
1974 ships
Ships built in Gdańsk
Naval ships built in Poland for export